The West London Synagogue of British Jews, abbreviated WLS (Kahal Kadosh Sha'ar Tziyon, "Holy Congregation Gate of Zion"), is a synagogue and congregation near Marble Arch in central London. It was established on 15 April 1840. The current synagogue building in Upper Berkeley Street, dedicated in 1870, is Grade II listed. It is one of the oldest synagogues in the United Kingdom and it was the oldest house of prayer affiliated with the Movement for Reform Judaism, before its affiliation lapsed in February 2023.

History

19th century
On 15 April 1840, 24 members of the Mocatta, Goldsmid and other families announced their secession from their respective congregations, the Sephardi Bevis Marks Synagogue and the Ashkenazi Great Synagogue of London, and their intention to form a prayer group for neither "German nor Portuguese" Jews but for "British Jews", which would allow them to worship together. The Mocattas and Goldsmids had been quarrelling with the wardens and complaining over lack of decorum for years. The new prayer group, convening in Burton Street, hired Reverend David Woolf Marks in March 1841. Marks and the congregation adopted a unique, bibliocentric approach often termed "neo-Karaism" by their critics, largely rejecting the authority of the Oral Torah. They abolished the second day of festivals and excised various prayers grounded in rabbinic tradition. It was only after almost a century that the congregation adopted mainstream Reform Judaism.

On 27 January 1842, the West London Synagogue of British Jews was consecrated in its first permanent building, at Burton Street Chapel. By 1848, it had become too crowded for the congregation. A new location was found, in Margaret Street, Cavendish Square, at a cost of £5,000. It was dedicated on 25 January 1849. In 1867, a new location was required again. Eventually, the current synagogue building in Upper Berkeley Street was opened on 22 September 1870. It cost £20,000 and had capacity for 1,000 congregants at the time.

Marks retired in 1895. His successor,  Rabbi Morris Joseph,  abandoned his predecessor's philosophy, which was never very popular with constituents, and brought West London closer to mainstream Reform by removing from the liturgy its petitions for the restoration of sacrifices in Jerusalem.

20th and 21st centuries
Since the 1920s, men and women have been able to sit together during synagogue services. In 1929, the synagogue appointed Hebrew Union College graduate  Rabbi Harold F Reinhart, who brought it into the World Union for Progressive Judaism. In 1942, West London Synagogue was a founding member of the Associated British Synagogues (called the Movement for Reform Judaism (MRJ) since 2005).

In 1957 Rabbi Reinhart resigned  as Senior Minister and, accompanied by 80 former members of West London Synagogue, established the New London Synagogue which, shortly afterwards, was renamed Westminster Synagogue.

He was succeeded by Rabbi Werner van der Zyl, who served as Senior Rabbi from 1958 to 1968. Rabbi Hugo Gryn succeeded van der Zyl in 1968, until his death in 1996.Rabbi Julia Neuberger served as senior rabbi from 2011 to 2020.

After a dispute with the Movement for Reform Judaism in 2020 surrounding allegations against Rabbi David Mitchell, West London Synagogue suspended its membership of the former. In February 2023, the synagogue's affiliation lapsed after a prolonged period of non-payment of fees to MRJ.

Archives
The synagogue's archives, from 1841 to 1942, are held in the University of Southampton Libraries Special Collections.

Current rabbis and wardens
Rabbis Helen Freeman and David Mitchell took up post as joint Senior Rabbis on 1 April 2020. As of 2021 the wardens are: John Axelson, William Campos-Ortega, Monica Jankel, Suzy Korel, Emma Levinson and Simon Raperport.

Ritual and edifice
Services at West London Synagogue follow the prayer books of the Movement for Reform Judaism, which incorporate material from both Sephardi and Ashkenazi traditions. A choir and organ, located behind a screen to the rear of the bimah, accompany the congregation in all musical parts of the service except for the aleinu and the kaddish. Men and women sit together during services, and also play equal parts in leading them. Male worshippers are required to wear a kippah; females can wear one if they wish to do so.

The current building, dating from 1870, is located near Marble Arch in London. The main sanctuary was built in the Neo-Byzantine architectural style by Davis & Emmanuel. Its premises, which extend into Seymour Place, also contain offices, a library and various community facilities. The bimah and ark were built in 1869–70 by Davis & Emmanuel. The synagogue's organ, which was renovated in 2007, has 55 stops on four manuals and pedal.

See also

 List of Jewish communities in the United Kingdom
 List of former synagogues in the United Kingdom
 Movement for Reform Judaism

Notes

References

External links
Official website
West London Synagogue of British Jews on Jewish Communities and Records – UK (hosted by JewishGen)

1840 establishments in England
Ashkenazi Jewish culture in London
Ashkenazi synagogues
Byzantine Revival architecture in the United Kingdom
Byzantine Revival synagogues
Grade II listed places of worship in the City of Westminster
Grade II listed religious buildings and structures
Reform synagogues in the United Kingdom
Religion in the City of Westminster
Religious organizations established in 1840
Sephardi Jewish culture in the United Kingdom
Sephardi Reform Judaism
Sephardi synagogues
Synagogues completed in 1870
Synagogues completed in 1934
Synagogues in London
West London Synagogue